Elburg van Boetzelaer (1506–1568) was the Abbess of the Rijnsburg Abbey from 1553 until 1568. She played an important part within the local Counter-Reformation by her reform work of Rijnsburg Abbey and her charity work, and also played a role as a patron of contemporary Dutch Renaissance art.

References 
 Kees Kuiken, Boetzelaer, Elburg van (den), in: Digitaal Vrouwenlexicon van Nederland. URL: http://resources.huygens.knaw.nl/vrouwenlexicon/lemmata/data/ElburgvanBoetzelaer [13/01/2014]

1506 births
1568 deaths
Roman Catholic abbesses
Nuns of the Habsburg Netherlands